Dhanapati is 2017 romantic and political movie directed by Dipendra K Khanal and written by Khagendra Lamichhane. The film stars Khagendra Lamichhane and Surakshya Panta. The film features a man named Dhanapati who struggles to get money to send his daughter to a good school, so he decides to go into politics to get money.

Plot 
A man named Dhanapati who struggles get money goes to a man named Rabi to find a job. Rabi then pulls Dhanapati into politics.

Cast 
 Khagendra Lamichhane as Dhanapati
 Surakshya Panta as Dhanapati's wife
 Janak Bartaula
 Kamal Devkota
 Prakash Ghimire
 Rabi Giri
 Manish Niraula
 Ashant Sharma
 Harihar Sharma

Soundtrack

Critical reception 
Dhanapati earned ₹10 million in the box office on its first day. Dhanapati received mixed reviews from the Nepalese audience.

References

External links
 

Nepalese drama films
2010s Nepali-language films
Films shot in Kathmandu
Films directed by Dipendra K Khanal
Films with screenplays by Khagendra Lamichhane